Gareth Irfon Evans (born 18 April 1986) is a Welsh weightlifter. He has competed in the 62 kg and 69 kg weight categories, and was selected to represent Great Britain at the 2012 Olympics.

Early and personal life
Evans was born to North Wales parents then resident in Dundee, Scotland, but the family moved back to their home in Holyhead, Anglesey before Evans started his schooling.

Evans started weightlifting aged 12, when he joined the local Holyhead Weightlifting Club. A trained painter and decorator, he gave up his job in preparation for the London 2012 Olympic Games, and moved for the preceding year to Headingley, Leeds, to train full-time at the British Weight Lifting High Performance Centre.

Evans has a daughter.

Career 
At the 2014 Commonwealth Games in Glasgow, Francois Etoundi a Cameroon-born weightlifter competing for Australia, competed in the men's 77 kg event where he won a bronze medal. The following day, he was arrested for breaking the nose of Evans, and ordered to pay £400 after appearing at Glasgow Sheriff Court. Etoundi was later stripped of his Commonwealth Games accreditation and sent home in disgrace.

London 2012 Olympics 
At the 2012 Olympics, in the snatch he lifted 130 kg, but failed his final attempt at 133 kg. In the clean and jerk, he lifted 158 kg but failed at 160 kg. With a personal best total of 288 kg, as well as personal bests in both the snatch and the clean and jerk, he finished eighth in group B and 17th overall in the 69 kg weight category.

Gold Coast 2018 Commonwealth Games 
Gareth Evans clinched his first Commonwealth Games medal during the 2018 Commonwealth Games on 6 April 2018 after winning a gold medal in the men's 69kg weightlifting event. This was also the first gold medal won by Wales at the Gold Coast Commonwealth Games.

Major results

References

External links

1986 births
Living people
Sportspeople from Dundee
Welsh male weightlifters
Welsh Olympic competitors
Olympic weightlifters of Great Britain
Weightlifters at the 2012 Summer Olympics
Weightlifters at the 2010 Commonwealth Games
Weightlifters at the 2014 Commonwealth Games
Weightlifters at the 2018 Commonwealth Games
Commonwealth Games gold medallists for Wales
Commonwealth Games medallists in weightlifting
Medallists at the 2018 Commonwealth Games